Metrodan Beersheba Ltd. was an Israeli bus company. It is owned, among others, by Tour Bus. Metrodan operated the urban bus lines within Beersheba from 2003 to 2016.

Metrodan was founded in 2003 in a joint venture by Metropoline and a company called Nahor Transportation (a subsidy of the Dan Bus Company).

In November 2016, All lines of Metrodan Beersheba were transferred to Dan Beersheva as Dan BaDarom which is the parent company won the tender of the Urban lines in Beersheva ten months earlier.

Bus companies of Israel
Transport in Beersheba